Pas or PAZ may refer to:

Places
 Paz, Croatia, a village and castle ruin in Istria, Croatia
 Pads, Iran or Faz, a village in Razavi Khorasan Province, Iran

Organisations
 Pavlovo Bus Factory or Pavlovsky Avtobusny Zavod, a Russian bus company
 Paz Oil Company, an Israeli fuel company
 El Tajín National Airport's IATA code

People with the surname 
Paz is a Spanish and Portuguese language surname.

 José C. Paz (1842–1912), Argentine politician
 Luis Paz (1854–1920), Bolivian jurist
 Víctor Paz Estenssoro (1907-2001), Bolivian politician
 Octavio Paz (1914–1998), Mexican writer and Nobel Prize winner
 Pilar Paz Pasamar (1932–2019), Spanish poet and writer
 Rodrigo Paz (1933–2021), Ecuadorian politician
 Jaime Paz Zamora (born 1939), Bolivian politician
 Rubén Paz (born 1959), Uruguayan former association football player
 Vinny Paz (born 1962), American former boxer
 Mercedes Paz (born 1966), Argentine former professional tennis player
 Rodrigo Paz Pereira (born 1967), Bolivian politician
 Lorna Paz (born 1970), Colombian actress
 Bárbara Paz (born 1974), Brazilian actress
 Vinnie Paz (born 1977), Italian-American rapper in the group Jedi Mind Tricks
 Pedro Paz (born 1994), Portuguese footballer
 Samera Paz (born 1994), American artist
 Bruno Paz (born 1998), Portuguese footballer

People with the given name
Paz is a female given name, a short form of Spanish María de la Paz or Portuguese Maria da Paz.
 Paz Lenchantin (born 1973), Argentine-American musician of French descent
 Paz Vega (born 1976), Spanish actress
 Paz de la Calzada, Spanish-born American visual artist
 Paz de la Huerta (born 1984), American actress and model

Fictional
 Paz Ortega Andrade, a character in the Metal Gear series

Other uses
 PAZ-3205, is a common Soviet midibus model made by the Pavlovo Bus Factory. 
 Paz (satellite), Spanish military Earth observation satellite.
 The Paz Show, a TV show featuring Paz the Penguin.
 Permanent autonomous zone, a community that is autonomous from the generally recognized government.
 Preußische Allgemeine Zeitung, a German conservative weekly.
 Paz, a Ghost in the Shell character.

See also
 La Paz (disambiguation)
 MV Doña Paz, a Philippine ferry